Elections to Liverpool City Council were held on Tuesday 1 November 1887. One third of the council seats were up for election, the term of office of each councillor being three years.

Fourteen of the sixteen seats were uncontested.

After the election, the composition of the council was:

Election result

Ward results

* - Retiring Councillor seeking re-election

Abercromby

Castle Street

Everton

Exchange

Great George

Lime Street

North Toxteth

Pitt Street

Rodney Street

St. Anne Street

St. Paul's

St. Peter's

Scotland

South Toxteth

Vauxhall

West Derby

By-elections

No. 2 Scotland, 29 December 1887

Caused by the resignation of Cllr. William Madden (Home Rule, elected unopposed 
1 November 1886)
.

No. 3, Vauxhall, 31 January 1888

Caused by the death of Councillor John Yates (Irish Home Rule, Vauxhall, elected 
unopposed 1 November 1886)
.

See also

 Liverpool City Council
 Liverpool Town Council elections 1835 - 1879
 Liverpool City Council elections 1880–present
 Mayors and Lord Mayors of Liverpool 1207 to present
 History of local government in England

References

1887
1887 English local elections
1880s in Liverpool